Opmeer (West Frisian: Opmar or Obmar) is a municipality and town in the Netherlands, in the province of North Holland and the region of West-Frisia.

Population centres 
The municipality of Opmeer consists of the following cities, towns, villages and/or districts:

Topography

Dutch Topographic map of the municipality of Opmeer, June 2015

Local government 
The municipal council of Opmeer consists of 15 seats, which are divided as follows:

The CDA and the Gemeentebelangen Opmeer are in a coalition government.

The town has an online portal with information on services and news.

Notable people 
 Hendrik Bosch (1776 in Spanbroek – unknown) a military officer and colonial government official on the Dutch Gold Coast 
 Johan Carel Marinus Warnsinck (1882 in Hoogwoud - 1943) a Dutch naval officer and naval historian
 Albert Langereis (1888 in Hoogwoud – 1966) a sports shooter, competed in two events at the 1924 Summer Olympics
 Robert Slippens (born 1975 in Opmeer) a Dutch racing cyclist, competed in three Summer Olympics

Gallery

References

External links 

Official website

 
Municipalities of North Holland
Populated places in North Holland